Crossings of the River Wye in the UK cover the whole length of the  from its source to the River Severn. For much of its length the river forms part of the border between England and Wales. The lower Wye Valley is an Area of Outstanding Natural Beauty. There are some 15 Grade II listed bridges, one Grade II* listed bridge and three Grade I listed bridges.

Crossings

In order, moving downstream:

See also

List of bridges in Wales
Wye Valley
Wye Valley Walk
List of crossings of the River Severn

Notes

External links

Lists of bridges in the United Kingdom
Wye
Lists of coordinates